Alpine Ice Arena is an arena and recreational sport facility in Louisville, Kentucky, operating since 1961. It features ice for hockey, figure skating, and open skating.

See also
 List of attractions and events in the Louisville metropolitan area

External links
 Official Alpine Ice Arena website

Indoor arenas in Kentucky
Indoor ice hockey venues in the United States
Sports venues in Louisville, Kentucky
Sports venues completed in 1961
1961 establishments in Kentucky